"Who Dat" is the fifth single from Young Jeezy's third studio album The Recession. The single features and was produced by Shawty Redd.

Music video
The music video is unlike a normal Young Jeezy video due to most of it being shot from a green screen. It also features a female dance crew and colorful backgrounds. Cameo appearances are made by DJ Khaled, Rick Ross, Ace Hood, Shawty Lo, Lil Scrappy, Gorilla Zoe, Busta Rhymes, Spliff Star, B.G., Yung Joc, Young Buck, Young Noble, E.D.I. Mean, Akon, Jadakiss, DJ Crazy Toones, Ice Cube, WC, Ice Cube's son Doughboy, Fabolous & Rocko.

Charts

References

2008 songs
2009 singles
Jeezy songs
Music videos directed by Gabriel Hart
New Orleans Saints
Songs written by Jeezy
Def Jam Recordings singles